Marimuthu Yoganathan popular as The Tree Man (born 1969) is an Indian environmental activist. He planted over 1 lakh 20 thousand trees in the last 28 years. He is working as Tamil Nadu State Transport Corporation Coimbatore Bus Conductor.

Life
When he was young he used to write poems sitting under trees in Kotagiri forests. He fought with the timber mafia for felling trees.

He works as a bus conductor with Tamil Nadu govt on S-26, runs on the Marudamalai-Gandhipuram route in Coimbatore. He works with school children and college students in creating the hazards of felling trees. He is a member of Tree Trust.

He uses 40% of his monthly salary towards buying saplings and educating children. He planted 4,20,000 tree saplings, by trekking the state of Tamil Nadu.

Honours 
 Eco Warrior award from the Vice President of India
 Government of Tamil Nadu has conferred on him the title Suttru Suzhal Sevai Veerar Award.
 CNN-IBN's Real Heroes Award

See also 
 Joan Root
 Dian Fossey
 Ken Saro-Wiwa
 Chico Mendes

References

External links 
  Official Website

People from Coimbatore
Indian environmentalists
Activists from Tamil Nadu
1969 births
Living people
Indian activists